

History
There are references in Jain texts to various areas of Southeast Asia. During the reign of Samprati, Jain teachers were sent to various Southeast Asian countries.

Prominent Jains (e.g., Jain monk Kshullaka Prayatna Sagar) from India have visited South East Asia for the purpose of representing Jainism, guiding the local Jain community and interacting with the members of other religious faiths, notably Buddhism.

Regions

Brunei
There is no evidence of Jainism in Brunei.

Burma (Myanmar)

The Jain Agamas refer to Southeast Asia as Suvarnabhumi. Kalakacharya, a Jain monk, is said to have visited Burma.

About 5000 Jain families lived in Burma before World War II. Almost all of the families have now left. There are three or four Jain families and a Jain temple in Yangon. It was built with romanesque architecture and is located on 29th Street in Latha Township in Old Rangoon. The Yangon Heritage Trust has been lobbying to preserve this temple, along with other prominent landmarks of Old Rangoon.

Cambodia
There is no evidence of Jainism in Cambodia.

Indonesia
A small Jain community exists in Indonesia. The community organises various Jain festivals in Jakarta. The community organisation is called Jain Social Group, Indonesia.

Laos
There is no presence of Jainism in Laos.

Malaysia
There are about 2,500 Jains in Malaysia. It is believed some of them came to Malacca in the 15th or 16th century.

The first Jain temple in Malaysia is located at Ipoh, Perak and was consecrated in 2012. There is also a Jain temple in Kuala Lumpur. The temple is located in the Bangsar locality of Kuala Lumpur and was built using 4000 kilograms of marble from India. Malaysia's Human Resources Minister Subramaniam Sathasivam was present during the inauguration of the temple in 2011.

The Jain community actively celebrates Jain festivals like Paryushan.

Hong Kong-China
There are about 500 Jains living in Hong Kong.They also have a Jain temple.

Singapore

Jains have been settled in Singapore since just before the First World War (1910 – 1914). As of 2006, there were 1,000 Jains in Singapore.

Thailand
Historically, Jain monks took Jain images to Thailand via Sri Lanka. A digambar Jain image is worshipped as an image of Buddha at Chiangmai. However, due to a rigid emphasis on austerity, Jainism did not take root in Thailand.

As of 2011, there are about 600 Jain families in Thailand, mainly in Bangkok. The Jain community in Thailand in not united, unlike the Jain communities in Singapore, the United States, and some other countries. Separate Jain temples exist for the Digambara and the Svetmabara Jain communities. The Digambar Jain Foundation was established in 2007.

The Jain community also sponsors local Thai PhD students to pursue higher studies in Jainism. Some restaurants in Thailand serve Jain food.

A majority of the diamond cutting and polishing business in Bangkok is handled by the Jain community.

Vietnam
There is no presence of Jainism in Vietnam.

See also 

 Indian religions
 Hinduism in Southeast Asia
 Jainism in the United States
 Jainism in the United Kingdom
 Jainism in Africa
 Spread of Indian influence
 Greater India
 Indosphere
 Buddhism in Southeast Asia
 Hinduism in Southeast Asia
 History of Indian influence on Southeast Asia
 Indianization of Southeast Asia
 Non-resident Indian and Overseas Citizen of India
 Trading routes
 Indian maritime history
 Silk Road
 Ancient maritime history

References

External links 
 Jainism in Southeast Asia 
 Jain diaspora
 Spread of Jainism in India and abroad- Helmuth Von Glasnapp

Southeast Asia
Religion in Southeast Asia